The Directorate General of Security is an organisation of covert operations under India's Cabinet Secretariat. It is one of the four legally defined intelligence organisations of India and listed in the Schedule of the Intelligence Organisations (Restriction of Rights) Act, 1985, the other three being I.B., R&AW and NTRO. Since 1971, the Secretary, Research and Analysis Wing has usually held the post of Director General. This organisation used to be composed of Special Service Bureau (now Sashastra Seema Bal), Aviation Research Centre, Special Frontier Force and Chief Inspectorate of Armaments. Since the shifting of SSB and CIOA to the Ministry of Home Affairs in 2001, DGS consists of ARC and SFF only. The Special Group, a non-Tibetan and Sarsawa-based unit of SFF, is also a DGS component.

Early history

In the wake of the Sino-Indian War of 1962, the Intelligence Bureau raised four new organisations in 1962-63: Indo-Tibetan Border Police (originally raised as Frontier Rifles), SFF, SSB and ARC. Of these four, only ITBP was an open force; one of the joint directors of IB, Sardar Balbir Singh, became its founder chief, while still retaining his post in the IB. The other three organisations were covert. Of these, SFF and ARC were set up with CIA help, as a part of CIA Tibetan program. To monitor these two, a CIA-IB joint operations centre was set up in November 1963 and was given the name, Special Centre. When B. N. Mullik, Director of the Intelligence Bureau retired in October 1964, he was re-employed to oversee these covert operations. His position got formalised in February 1965 as Director General of Security. The DGS was established in the Prime Minister's Secretariat (now Prime Minister's Office). SFF, ARC and SSB, already shifted from the Ministry of External Affairs to the Prime Minister's Secretariat on 1 January 1965, became components of this new organisation. The whole set-up was moved to the Cabinet Secretariat on 1 September 1965. Another organisation, Inspectorate of Armaments (later, Chief Inspectorate of Armaments) was created as a part of DGS in 1969. The DGS was declared as a force under section 45(b)(iii) of the Arms Act, 1959 on 21 August 1969.

Organisational structure

The DGS was headed by a Director General, the post being generally held by the Secretary, R&AW. The No. 2 post was called Principal Director, who actually ran the organisation. Below him, there were five set-ups:

Secretariat, headed by Joint Director (Planning & Coordination).
Special Service Bureau, headed by Director. Field formations were headed by Divisional Organisers. The divisions were:
Manipur & Nagaland (This division was called Village Volunteer Force)
Arunachal Pradesh (The Divisional Organiser had dual charge, the other being Security Commissioner of NEFA)
North Assam
North Bengal & Sikkim
South Bengal
Uttar Pradesh
Punjab & Himachal Pradesh
Jammu & Kashmir
Rajasthan & Gujarat
Shillong
Aviation Research Centre, headed by Director. Field formations, at Charbatia, Odisha, headed by Joint Director; Doom Dooma, Assam, headed by Deputy Director; Sarsawa, Uttar Pradesh, headed by Deputy Director; Dharamshala, Himachal Pradesh; Leh, Ladakh, headed by Assistant Director. Has an air base at Palam, Delhi.
Special Frontier Force, headed by Inspector General. Field formation at Chakrata, Uttarakhand, known as Establishment 22, headed by Commandant (equivalent to brigadier). Another field formation at Sarsawa, Uttar Pradesh, which houses the Special Group. Battalions known as Vikas battalions.
Chief Inspectorate of Armaments, Delhi-based, headed by Chief Inspector (equivalent to lieutenant colonel).

Major missions

Nanda Devi and Nanda Kot Missions

Both of these were joint covert operations of CIA and ARC. The purpose was to place a nuclear-powered telemetry relay listening device on a sufficiently high mountain to listen to Chinese radio signals. First attempt was for Mount Nanda Devi in 1965, which failed due to a severe blizzard. Second attempt was for Mount Nanda Kot in 1966, which succeeded. Team leader of the expedition was Navy Captain Mohan Singh Kohli.

SSB's resistance movement in 1965

During the Indo-Pakistani War of 1965, village volunteers, male and female, trained in armed guerrilla warfare by SSB, had participated in protecting the Indian border. The founder chief of DGS and SSB, B. N. Mullik described this in details in his 1973 article, The Motto of SSB. Mullik also wrote in that article that by 1965, a million and a half men and women had been trained throughout the border.

Training of Mujib Bahini

The training of Mukti Bahini was arranged by R&AW at camps of BSF, CRPF, Assam Rifles and Rajasthan Armed Constabulary. But the members of the Mujib Bahini, drawn from Bangladesh Chhatra League, did not want anything to do with Mukti Bahini and the provisional government. So they were trained by SFF at Tandawa, near Chakrata, and by SSB, at Haflong training centre.

Operation Mountain Eagle

This is the engagement SFF's Tibetan soldiers in the Chittagong Hill Tracts during the Bangladesh War, described in depth by SFF chief Sujan Singh Uban in his Phantoms of Chittagong: The "Fifth Army" in Bangladesh.

SSB operations during Bangladesh War

Other than training activities, SSB also ran intelligence operations and refugee relief camps on a major scale during the Bangladesh War. As a result, Hara Nath Sarkar and Debakant Kakati, Divisional Organisers of North Bengal and North Assam Divisions, respectively, were awarded the President's Police Medal for Meritorious Service (Bangladesh Special Award).

Raising the Special Group

This force was raised in 1981, under command of IG, SFF. This unit, unlike Tibetan refugees, is composed entirely of deputationists from the Army. By 1984, it had become the primary counter-terrorism force of India. This force was deployed in Operation Blue Star. After the assassination of Indira Gandhi, the SG was given the responsibility of prime ministerial security till the raising of the Special Protection Group.

Raising the National Security Guard

R. T. Nagrani, the then Principal Director, DGS, was tasked with the SG operations in the Golden Temple (Both Sundown and Blue Star; Sundown was aborted). After this, under advice of R. N. Kao, who had come back from retirement as Senior Advisor to the Prime Minister (precursor post of today's National Security Advisor), the PM asked Nagrani to raise a separate force for counter-terrorism. Nagrani did it with a core group of SG operatives. This became known as the National Security Guard. Nagrani became its first DG, while still retaining his post of Principal Director, DGS and later, DG (Security).

Operation Meghdoot

Operation Meghdoot was launched by the Indian Army in 1984 to capture the Siachen Glacier, in which SFF commandos played a pivotal role. One of the Tibetan battalions of SFF is still deployed there.

Operation Vijay

The DGS had used SFF in the Kargil War in 1999. Earlier, ARC surveillance missions had verified presence of Pakistani troops on the Indian side with photographic evidence.

Operation Snow Leopard

In the ongoing Sino-Indian border dispute, India used Tibetan components of SFF in 2020–2021 China–India skirmishes, to capture prominent hill tops south of the Pangong Tso in Ladakh on 31 August 2020 and thereafter in the Galwan River Valley conflict.

Service chiefs

From 1965 to 1971, the Director General of Security was a separate post; since then the post has been held by Secretary, R&AW, except a brief interlude, when R. T. Nagrani held the post separately. After creation of the post of Principal Director, the incumbent of that post ran the organisation under the overall command of Secretary (R). The post of PD was shifted to the Ministry of Home Affairs on 15 January 2001 as Director General, SSB; when SSB and CIOA were moved. Thereafter, the post of Director, ARC was raised from Additional Secretary to Special Secretary level with the concomitant role of Head of Department, SFF.

Director General (Security)

Principal Director, DGS

Incumbents of this post ran the DGS organisation since 1974 under overall command of Secretary (R).

Special Secretary, ARC

Rank structure

Note: Combatised personnel of SFF have pay parity with the Army, vide Cabinet Secretariat Order dated 16.10.2009; pension & pensionary
benefits to SFF personnel are also at par with Indian Army for Group 'Y' 'Personnel Below Officer Rank' (PBORs). In addition, army personnel on deputation to Special Group (4 Vikas) of SFF get special force allowance (SFA) and para pay.

References

Indian intelligence agencies